Aerosteon is a genus of megaraptoran dinosaur from the Late Cretaceous period of Argentina. Its remains were discovered in 1996 in the Anacleto Formation, which is from the late Campanian. The type and only known species is A. riocoloradensis. Its specific name indicates that its remains were found 1 km (0.6 miles) north of the Río Colorado, in Mendoza Province, Argentina.

They show evidence of a bird-like respiratory system. Aerosteons name can be translated as air bone and derives from Greek ἀήρ (aer, "air") and ὀστέον (osteon, "bone").

Discovery
 
Aerosteon was first discovered in 1996 and was first described by Sereno et al. in a paper which appeared in the online journal PLoS ONE in September 2008. However, at the time, the International Code of Zoological Nomenclature did not recognize online publication of names for new species as valid unless print copies were also produced and distributed to several libraries, and that this action is noted in the paper itself. PLoS ONE initially failed to meet this requirement for Aerosteon. On May 21, 2009, the journal's managing editor coordinated with the ICZN to correct this oversight, publishing a comment to the original paper with an addendum stating that the requirements had been met as of that date. Consequently, though the description appeared in 2008, Aerosteon was not a valid name until 2009.

The holotype specimen, MCNA-PV-3137''' consists of some cranial bones, a number of partial or complete vertebrae from the neck, back, and sacrum, several cervical and dorsal ribs, gastralia, furcula (wishbone), left scapulocoracoid, left ilium, and left and right pubes. The incomplete fusion of some of its bones indicate that it was not quite fully mature. No dental material is known for this taxon as the isolated tooth initially referred to the holotype was revealed to belong to an abelisaurid theropod.

 Description 

 

 Classification Aerosteon did not initially appear to belong to any of the three groups of large theropods that were known to have inhabited the southern continents during this time (namely the Abelisauridae, Carcharodontosauridae or Spinosauridae). Sereno suggested that it might be related to the allosauroid radiation of the Jurassic period, and this was supported in subsequent studies that recognized a clade of late-surviving, lightly built, advanced allosauroids with large hand claws similar to the spinosaurs, called the Megaraptora, within the allosaur family Neovenatoridae. A later analysis has placed Megaraptora, including Aerosteon, within the Tyrannosauroidea. Megaraptorans have since been also considered as non-tyrannosauroid basal coelurosaurs in some analyses.

A very close relative of Aerosteon, Murusraptor, was described in 2016 which preserved some bones with a lesser level of pneumaticity. However, the Murusraptor holotype also preserved several teeth which were very dissimilar to the one tooth observed in Aerosteon's holotype. The authors of the description noted that this tooth closely resembled that of abelisaurids and was probably incorrectly referred to Aerosteon. Murusraptor and Aerosteon are practically identical in the structure of their cranial bones and vertebrae, only noticeably differing in the proportions of the ilium, with Aerosteon's ilium being taller than that of Murusraptor.

The cladogram below follows the 2010 analysis by Benson, Carrano and Brusatte, which considered megaraptorans as tetanurans.

The cladogram shown below follows an analysis by Porfiri et al., 2014, which recovered megaraptorans as tyrannosauroids.

 Paleobiology 

Some of Aerosteon's bones show pneumatization (air-filled spaces), including pneumatic hollowing of the furcula and ilium, and pneumatization of several gastralia. The addition of pneumatization throughout the bones of Aerosteon shows the evolutionary progress of the avian air sacs, which first appear as features on the sides of vertebrae, before being incorporated within bones throughout the skeleton. These air sacs would have acted like bellows, moving air into and out of the animal's relatively inflexible lungs, instead of the lungs themselves being expanded and contracted as occurs with mammals. See avian respiratory system for more detailed information on this.

Sereno et al. theorize that this respiratory system may have developed to assist with regulating body temperature and was later co-opted for breathing.

PaleoecologyAerosteon'' lived approximately 84 million years ago during the Santonian stage.

References

External links 
 New Birdlike Dinosaur Found in Argentina
 Meat-eating dinosaur had bird-like breathing
 Dinosaur predator breathed like a modern bird

Megaraptorans
Santonian life
Late Cretaceous dinosaurs of South America
Cretaceous Argentina
Fossils of Argentina
Anacleto Formation
Fossil taxa described in 2009
Taxa named by Paul Sereno